"Crazy Love" is a song written and recorded by Paul Anka in 1958.  It was released by ABC-Paramount Records as a single with the song, "Let the Bells Keep Ringing", on the b-side.
Anka performed the song on Dick Clark's Saturday Night Show on April 5, 1957.

"Let the Bells Keep Ringing" reached number 4 in the Canadian CHUM Charts. 

The spanish adaptation of this song sounds in a film I am Cuba (1964).

References

1957 songs
1958 singles
Paul Anka songs
Songs written by Paul Anka